Weissia sterilis is a species of moss in the family Pottiaceae. It is found in lowland grasslands in Europe, mainly France and Great Britain. It is classified as a near-threatened species due to habitat degradation, decreasing population size, extensive ploughing and the cessation of grazing.

References

Plants described in 1903
Pottiaceae